Wetherby Racecourse railway station was a railway station on the Harrogate to Church Fenton Line serving Wetherby Racecourse in Wetherby, West Yorkshire, England.

When Wetherby's original station on York Road closed in 1902, for two decades the only rail access was via Wetherby's new station on Linton Road.  This was some distance from the racecourse, involving a walk of just over 2 miles.

There was therefore a station built at Wetherby Racecourse in 1924, with a ticket booth of wooden construction, starter signals, a ground frame and a footbridge. It even boasted electrical lighting and its own nameboard.

Race specials would stop at this 'Racecourse station', about three quarters of a mile from Linton Road towards Thorp Arch.  These specials came from Leeds, Doncaster and Bradford Exchange and Sheffield.

Reports vary as to when it closed; one report says it stayed open until 1963 with Racecourse Specials running to the station from Bradford Exchange on racedays, whilst another publication states that it was last used on Whit Monday 18 May 1959 and was demolished in 1962.  The line closed in 1964.

References

Disused railway stations in Leeds
Former London and North Eastern Railway stations
Railway stations in Great Britain opened in 1924
Railway stations in Great Britain closed in 1959
railway station, Wetherby
1924 establishments in England
1959 disestablishments in England